Tomáš Hořava (born 29 May 1988) is a former Czech football player, who last played for Viktoria Plzeň. He was member of the Czech under-21 team. He represented the team at the 2011 UEFA European Under-21 Football Championship.

International career

International goals
Scores and results list Czech Republic's goal tally first.

Career statistics
As 1 June 2015

Honours 
SK Sigma Olomouc
 Czech Supercup: 2012

References

External links

Profile at iDNES.cz

Czech footballers
1988 births
Living people
Czech First League players
SK Sigma Olomouc players
FC Viktoria Plzeň players
Czech Republic under-21 international footballers
Czech Republic international footballers
Association football midfielders
Footballers from Brno